The FIBA Asia Champions Cup 2008 was the 19th staging of the FIBA Asia Champions Cup, the basketball club tournament of FIBA Asia. The tournament was held in Kuwait City, Kuwait between May 8, 2008 and May 19. The tournament was scheduled to end on May 16 but the schedule changed due to the death of the former Emir of Kuwait Sheikh Saad Al-Abdullah Al-Salim Al-Sabah. The committee decided to call off the play-off matches to decide the 5–10 positions.

Preliminary round

Group A

Group B

Knockout round

Quarterfinals

Semifinals

Finals

Final standings

Awards
Most Valuable Player:  Gabe Muoneke (Saba Battery Tehran)

References

Official Website
Goalzz
FIBAAsia.net

2008
Champions Cup
FIBA Asia Champions Cup 2008
2008 in Kuwaiti sport